Munroa squarrosa is a species of grass known by the common name false buffalograss. It is native to North America from central Canada to Chihuahua in Mexico. It can be found in many types of dry, open habitat, including disturbed areas.

Description
It is an annual bunchgrass producing a stem with many branches forming a tangled mat no more than 20 centimeters wide. The short, narrow, spiky leaves are 1 to 2 centimeters long and have hair-lined edges. The inflorescence is short and sometimes located within a crowded cluster of leaves toward the ends of the stems. The hairy spikelets are just under a centimeter in length.

References

External links
Jepson Manual Treatment
Grass Manual Treatment

Chloridoideae
Bunchgrasses of North America
Grasses of Canada
Grasses of the United States
Native grasses of California
Grasses of Mexico
Flora of the Western United States
Flora of the California desert regions
Flora of Northwestern Mexico
Flora of Northeastern Mexico
Flora without expected TNC conservation status